HTMS Kraburi (FFG-457) is the third ship of  of the Royal Thai Navy, a variant of the Chinese-built Type 053H2 frigate.

Design and description 
Kraburi has a complement of 168 personnel, including 22 officers.

As a Type 053HT (H) frigate, the ship were armed with one 100 mm/56 Type 79 twin-barreled gun and four 37 mm Type 76 twin-barreled guns. For anti-submarine warfare, the ship is equipped with two Type 86 anti-submarine rocket launchers and two BMB depth charge racks. For surface warfare, Kraburi was equipped with eight C-801 anti-ship missile launchers. She also has a flight deck and able to carry a helicopter, although the ship didn't have a hangar.

Kraburi underwent modernization program in 2009. The upgrade includes replacement of old weapons and electronic systems with newer systems, such as new 100 mm/56 Type 79A twin-barreled gun and 37 mm Type 76A twin-barreled remote-controlled guns along with their respective fire control radars and the installation of new C-802A anti-ship missiles.

Construction and career 
The four ships of the class was ordered on 18 July 1988. Kraburi was laid down somewhere in 1990 at Hudong Shipyard, Shanghai. The ship was launched on 28 December 1990 and was commissioned on 16 January 1992. Upon the ship completion and arrival on Thailand, the shipbuilding quality were deemed to be unsatisfactory and works was needed to improve the ship. The damage control abilities were also upgraded before she entered service.

Upon entering service, Kraburi and her sisters were frequently used for training and rotated monthly to the Coast Guard.

The two frigates also escorted the aircraft carrier in the journey back to Thailand, of which they arrived on 10 August 1997.

The ship was damaged and washed ashore in the aftermath of 2004 Indian Ocean earthquake and tsunami that occurred on 26 December 2004. She was repaired and re-entered service by February 2005.

Kraburi and  attended the 30th India-Thailand Coordinated Patrol (Indo-Thai CORPAT) on 18–20 November 2022.

On the 18 December 2022, corvette  were flooded and listing after being caught in a storm off Bang Saphan, Prachuap Khiri Khan province. Of the several ships and helicopters sent to assist the corvette, only Kraburi managed to arrived on the scene and rescued the personnel before Sukhothai sunk in the midnight. As of 26 December, Kraburi along with other ships continued to search the area for still-missing person.

References

Printed sources 
 
 
 

Ships built in China
1990 ships
Chao Phraya-class frigates